Naivelt ("New World") was a Yiddish-language literary monthly magazine published in Argentina from 1927–1930. Politically, Naivelt was pro-communist but without open affiliation to the Communist Party. It was published by a group of leftist writers, also going by the name Naivelt. Hirsh Bloshtein was the editor of Naivelt. Bloshtein was deported in 1931 for communist activities.

References

External links

1927 establishments in Argentina
1930 disestablishments in Argentina
Ashkenazi Jewish culture in Argentina
Communism in Argentina
Communist magazines
Defunct literary magazines
Defunct magazines published in Argentina
Defunct political magazines
Jewish Argentine history
Magazines established in 1927
Magazines disestablished in 1930
Monthly magazines published in Argentina
Secular Jewish culture in South America
Yiddish socialist periodicals
Yiddish culture in South America
Literary magazines published in Argentina